The InterContinental Kyiv is a five star hotel in the center of Kyiv, Ukraine (Old Kyiv neighborhood). The 11-story hotel has 272 hotel rooms, and is operated by the InterContinental Hotels Group. The hotel is next to the Mykhailivs'ka ploshcha (Michael's Square). There is an underground garage with a controlled access.

Awards

IHG Hotel Star Awards 2015 

 InterContinental Hotel of the Year 2015
 HeartBeat Excellence Award 2015
 Developing People Award 2015

IHG Celebrate Cervice 2015 

 Winner EMEA Video Award 2015

Ukrainian Hospitality Awards 2014 

 Best 5* Business Hotel 2014

IHG Hotel Star Awards 2014 

 CEO Special Award 2014
 Great Hotels Guests Love Award 2014

Ukrainian Hospitality Awards 2013 

 Best Business Hotel 2013
 Best SCR Program 2013

Ukrainian Hospitality Awards 2012 

 Business Hotel of the Year 2012

Ukrainian Hospitality Awards 2011 

 Business Hotel of the Year 2011

Luxury Lifestyle Awards 2010 

 Luxury Lifestyle Best Hotel 2010

Amenities
Amenities include fitness center, an indoor lap pool, jacuzzi, full service spa, a business center, and permit pets some rooms.  The conference center contains Grand Ballroom and 5 meeting rooms.

See also

 List of hotels in Ukraine#Kyiv
 List of tallest buildings in Kyiv

References

External links
 Київ обігнав Париж і Амстердам за дорожнечею готелів (Kyiv passed Paris and Amsterdam for the price of hotels) (picture of InterContinental Kyiv)

InterContinental hotels
Tourist attractions in Kyiv
Hotels in Kyiv
Hotels established in 2009